Her Sturdy Oak (also known as The Clinging Vine) is a 1921 black & white silent American comedy film directed by Thomas N. Heffron and written by Elmer Blaney Harris. Released by Realart Pictures Corporation, the film stars Wanda Hawley, Walter Hiers, and Sylvia Ashton, with a supporting cast of Mayme Kelso, Leo White and Fred R. Stanton.

Her Sturdy Oak is considered a "lost silent feature" by the US Library of Congress.

Cast   
Wanda Hawley as Violet White
Walter Hiers as Samuel Butteers
Sylvia Ashton as Belle Bright
Mayme Kelso as Mrs. White
Leo White as Archibald Mellon
Fred R. Stanton as Ranch Foreman

References

External links
 

1921 films
American black-and-white films
Silent American comedy films
American silent feature films
1920s English-language films
1921 comedy films
1921 lost films
Lost American films
Lost comedy films
Films directed by Thomas N. Heffron
1920s American films